Mark Kwok may refer to:

 Mark Kwok (actor) (born 1963)
 Mark Kwok (swimmer) (born 1977)